The 1965 Cal State Hayward Pioneers football team represented California State College at Hayward—now known California State University, East Bay—as a member of the Far Western Conference (FWC) during the 1965 NCAA College Division football season. This was the first season that Cal State Hayward fielded a football team. Led by Darryl Rogers in his first and only season as head coach, Cal State Hayward compiled an overall record of 3–7. The team's games against conference opponents did not count the FWC standings. The Cal State Hayward was outscored by its opponents 245 to 62 for the season. The Pioneers played home games at Pioneer Stadium in Hayward, California.

Schedule

Notes

References

Cal State Hayward
Cal State Hayward Pioneers football seasons
Cal State Hayward Pioneers football